Talageh-ye Sofla or Talagah-e Sofla may refer to:
 Talageh-ye Sofla, Khuzestan
 Talagah-e Sofla, Kohgiluyeh and Boyer-Ahmad